Sigfried is a male given name, and may refer to:

 Sigfried, Count of the Ardennes (922–998), first ruler of Luxembourg
 Sigfried Giedion (1888–1968), Bohemia-born Swiss historian
 Sigfried Held (born 1942), former German football player

See also

 Siegfried

Masculine given names